USS Iwo Jima (CV-46) was a planned  for the United States Navy. Newport News Shipbuilding began construction of the vessel in early 1945, but on August 12, with the end of World War II, the Navy cancelled the contract.  She remained in an unfinished state until 1949, when her hull was scrapped in the slipway in Newport News before ever being launched.

References

Bibliography

 

Essex-class aircraft carriers
1945 ships
World War II aircraft carriers of the United States